Herbert Anthony Adderley (June 8, 1939 – October 30, 2020) was an American professional football player who was a cornerback for the Green Bay Packers and the Dallas Cowboys of the National Football League (NFL). In 1980, he was enshrined in the Pro Football Hall of Fame.

Adderley played college football for the Michigan State Spartans and was an All-Big Ten offensive star as a halfback.  He is the only player to appear in four of the first six Super Bowls.

Early life
Born and raised in Philadelphia, Pennsylvania, Adderley's parents were Charles and Reva (White) Adderley.  He graduated from Northeast High School in 1957, where he starred in football, basketball, and baseball, and won All-City Honors in all three.

College career
Adderley attended Michigan State University in East Lansing and played football under head coach Duffy Daugherty, primarily as a halfback.  He led the Spartans in rushing yards as a junior in 1959 and pass receptions in both 1959 and 1960.  Adderley was the co-captain of the team as a senior, and made the All-Big Ten Conference team and played in the East-West Shrine Game, the Coaches' All-American, and the College All-Star games.  He was picked for the All-Michigan State University team in 1970. 

He is also one of the founding members of the Sigma Chapter of Omega Psi Phi fraternity at Michigan State University along with Ernie Green of the "Little Rock Nine" established on campus in 1961. 
1958: 9 Games - 37 carries for 143 yards and 2 TD. 6 catches for 100 yards.
1959: 9 Games - 93 carries for 413 yards and 2 TD. 13 catches for 265 yards and 2 TD.
1960: 9 Games - 68 carries for 251 yards. 9 catches for 154 yards and 2 TD.

Professional career
Adderley was selected by the Green Bay Packers in the first round of the 1961 NFL draft, the 12th overall pick. He began his professional career as a halfback on offense, but was later switched to defense because the Packers already had eventual Hall of Fame runners in Paul Hornung and Jim Taylor. Adderley was first moved to cornerback to replace  injured teammate Hank Gremminger against Detroit on Thanksgiving. and made an interception that set up the game-winning touchdown.

In 1962, the move became permanent and Adderley went on to become an all-NFL selection five times in the 1960s. Packers coach Vince Lombardi remarked, "I was too stubborn to switch him to defense until I had to. Now when I think of what Adderley means to our defense, it scares me to think of how I almost mishandled him."

Adderley recorded 39 interceptions in his nine seasons with the Packers. He held the Green Bay records for interceptions returned for touchdowns in a career (seven, tied with Darren Sharper, broken by Charles Woodson), and holds the record for interceptions returned for touchdowns in one season (three, in 1965).

Adderley started for the Packers from 1961–1969, then played three seasons (1970–1972) with the Dallas Cowboys. While with the Packers, he won rings for five NFL championships and wins in the first two Super Bowls. Adderley was a factor in the Super Bowl II win over the Oakland Raiders, intercepting a pass by Raiders quarterback Daryle Lamonica in the fourth quarter and returning it 60 yards for a touchdown to put the game away. It was the first Super Bowl touchdown scored on an intercepted pass.

Adderley had a strained relationship with Phil Bengtson by the end of the latter's second and penultimate year as Packers head coach. He accused Bengtson of keeping him off the Pro Bowl team in 1969 and requested to be traded. After a holdout and two weeks before the start of the regular season, he was sent from the Packers to the Dallas Cowboys for Malcolm Walker and Clarence Williams on September 1, 1970. He became a vital cog in its "Doomsday Defense," assisting the Cowboys to a Super Bowl appearance in V and a win in VI.

Adderley admired Packer head coach Vince Lombardi, but not Tom Landry of the Cowboys. He opted not to report and retired on August 7, after a dozen seasons in the NFL.

Along with the Patriots' Tom Brady, and two Packer teammates, offensive linemen Fuzzy Thurston (Colts) and Forrest Gregg (Cowboys), Adderley is one of only four players in pro football history to play on six world championship teams. However, in a revised edition of Instant Replay, a memoir by Packer teammate Jerry Kramer, Adderley is quoted as saying, "I'm the only man with a Dallas Cowboys Super Bowl ring who doesn't wear it. I'm a Green Bay Packer."

In his 12 seasons, Adderley recorded 48 interceptions, which he returned for 1,046 yards and seven touchdowns, an average of 21.8 yards per return. He also recovered 14 fumbles (returning them for 65 yards) and returned 120 kickoffs for 3,080 yards and two scores.

Adderley was the first NFL player ever to gain more than 1,000 interception return yards.  Only 8 other players have achieved this since then, and all of them did so with more interceptions than Adderley.

Post-NFL
After Adderley retired, he returned to Philadelphia to broadcast football games for Temple University and the Philadelphia Eagles.  He also coached as an assistant at Temple and with the Philadelphia Bell of the World Football League under head coach Willie Wood, a Packer teammate.

Adderley was inducted into the Pro Football Hall of Fame in 1980. A year after his induction in Canton, Adderley became a member of the Packer Hall of Fame in 1981. He was also chosen for the AFL-NFL 1960-1984 All-Star teams.

Adderley's cousin's grandson (first cousin twice removed), Nasir Adderley, was drafted by the Los Angeles Chargers in the second round of the 2019 NFL Draft.

Adderley died on October 30, 2020 at the age of 81.

References

External links
 
 

1939 births
2020 deaths
American football cornerbacks
American football return specialists
College football announcers
Dallas Cowboys players
Green Bay Packers players
Michigan State Spartans football players
Philadelphia Eagles announcers
Temple Owls football coaches
Temple Owls football announcers
Philadelphia Bell coaches
Pro Football Hall of Fame inductees
Western Conference Pro Bowl players
Players of American football from Philadelphia